The Acadia Students' Union represents the undergraduate students at Acadia University in Wolfville, Nova Scotia, Canada. They are a member of the Canadian Alliance of Students Associations (CASA) and StudentsNS (formerly ANSSA).

History

The Acadia Students' Union is a not-for-profit student organization that provides services, events, societies and advocacy work to the students of Acadia University. Founded in 1967, it is an organization led by students in order to provide services and events to the students at Acadia.  It consists of over 80 employees and many more volunteers.

The ASU offers many Student Services to help Acadia students have a worthwhile university experience. These services include Off-Campus Housing Assistance, the Safety and Security Shuttle (which helps students get from place to place around campus and off in the evenings) and the Health and Dental Plan. The ASU also hosts the clubs that operate through the ASU, as well as the Internal Organizations like the student-led campus newspaper, The Athenaeum; the campus radio station, Axe Radio; and the Environment and Sustainability Office (AESO). Cajun's, the Union operated clothing store is also owned and operated by the ASU with the proceeds from these sales going directly back to the students.

Students' Union Building

The Acadia Students' Union operates out of the Students' Union Building (SUB) located on Highland Avenue in Wolfville, Nova Scotia. This location, central to the Acadia University campus, is owned and operated by the union.

Inside the building is located several ASU run services as well as offices for the ASU Executive, all of the Internal Organizations, and the university office of Residence Life. The services provided inside the Students' Union Building are the Union Market convenience store, Perkin's Cafe (named after the 12th President of Acadia University), Cajuns Clothing Store, the Axe Lounge, and the Sexual Health Resource Centre. The building also includes an Information Desk which offers postal services, bus tickets, and dry cleaning.

The Axe Lounge, which is the only on-campus bar for students, is set to undergo renovations over the summer of 2016. It was last renovated in 2014 in a joint fundraising effort between the ASU and the 2014 Grad Class to help make the Students' Union Building more accessible (the lounge previously could not be accessed by anyone in a wheelchair). This second renovation is set to be much more ambitious and could cost upwards of two million dollars to complete. The renovation was decided by referendum during the 2016 ASU General Election which it passed. Construction is set to begin during April 2016. The goal is to help offset these costs through an increase in union fees. On the cost per student, The Athenaeum reported "Part of this cost will be incurred through ASU student union dues, at a rate of fifteen dollars per student per semester for the first five years of operation, and then changing to a total of twenty-five dollars per semester per student."

The new Axe Lounge will aim to be a student hub with extended hours during the day and bolstered services. The kitchen which currently operates through The Axe Handle grill will be moved into the lounge and will offer a full menu during the day and increased employment opportunities for students.

Students' Representative Council

The Students' Representative Council (SRC) is the governing body of the Acadia Students' Union. As such, the legislative authority of the organization and its power are governed by the ASU Constitution and By-Laws. The SRC is made up of elected and appointed members from all areas of the Acadia community. These include the Students' Union Executive, the Office of the Chairperson, a Diversity & Inclusion Representative, Board of Governors Representative, Faculty Representatives, and Councillors.

The Office of the Chairperson is responsible for the effective and efficient execution of all Council and Committee meetings and ensuring that the student body is kept apprised of any important Council decisions and opportunities to get involved. The Chairperson for the 2017/2018 academic year is Oliver Jacob.

While the SRC makes overarching policy decisions for the Union, the ASU executive is tasked with its day-to-day governance and is made up of five members detailed below.

President of the Union

The primary function of the president of the ASU is to oversee the actions of their executive and to serve as the public face of the union. As such, they serve as the Chief Executive Officer of the union and are "responsible to the S.R.C. for efficient and proper administration of the Union"

The position of ASU President for the 2021-2022 academic year is held by Matthew Stanbrook, who also holds the position of Vice-Chair for Students Nova Scotia. Matthew is in his fifth year of a double major in Biology and History.

Vice President Events and Promotions
The Vice President Communications within the ASU is responsible for all advertising and promotion of union events within the university. They are the official press liaison of the union and as such have to prepare an effective communication strategy at the beginning of each academic year. They are also responsible for overseeing all clubs and societies within the ASU with the exception of Internal Organizations.

The position of ASU Vice President Events and Promotions for the 2021-2022 academic year is held by Tanvi Dabas, who also holds the position of Vice President of Communications for the Canadian Atlantic Foodservice Partners. Tanvi is an International Student Ambassador and in her fourth year double major in Psychology and Nutrition.

Vice President Student Life
The Vice President Programming is responsible for coordinating ASU sanctioned events on campus. These include Welcome Week ("Frosh Week"), Winter Carnival, the Student Leadership Awards, and "Other Union events or activities as determined by the Executive or by Council." The VPP is also in charge of liaisons between the ASU and all internal organizations as well as the coordinator of the House Council System.

The position of ASU Vice President Programming for the 2021-2022 academic year is held by Georgia Saleski, who also holds the position of Graduating Class Representative for the Acadia Kinesiology Society. Georgia is in her fourth her of a Kinesiology major.

Vice President Academic & External
The ASU Vice President Academic serves the ASU in Academic matters and acts "as a liaison between the Union and the offices of the University Vice President Academic, the Registrar, Admissions, Student Accounts, Financial Aid, Career Services, the Learning Commons, and the Student Resource Centre". They also represent the union as the Acadia delegate for external lobbying organizations. The Vice President Academic from Acadia during 2012-2013, Kyle Power, served as chairperson of StudentsNS as part of filling these duties.

The position of ASU Vice President Academic for the 2021-2022 academic year is held by Megan Cyr, who is a previous House Council Executive for Cutten House. Megan is in her fourth her of a double major in Community Development and Environmental Sustainability Studies.

Vice President Finance and Operation
The Vice President Finance is responsible for the supervision of all funds that are held by the ASU and manage the accounts of students association and House Councils to ensure they are in good order. In addition, they must monitor all expenditure and revenue streamline within the union and approve all purchases made by members of the Acadia Students' Union. This position also requires to contact a number of business owners based on the sponsorship with the ASU, ensure they recognize us as value provides. 

The position of ASU Vice President, Finance and Operation for the 2021-2022 academic year is held by Fumiya Kanai, a fourth-year business technology management student. He was Vice President, Finance at Acadia Medical Campus Response Team through the 2020-2021 year, while being licensed as Medical First Responder.

Former ASU Executive Teams

In 2011, the ASU reconfigured the makeup of the ASU Executive. The end result was a new, five member executive designed to be more effective at governing the ASU.

The ASU also enacted further updates to position titles and descriptions in late 2016. Each executive team since that reconfiguration can be found in the table below.

Internal Organizations

After a review of Internal Organizations in 2014, the Acadia Students' Union offers ten official Internal Organizations that receive funding from the ASU Budget. These organizations are beholden to more restrictions than other ratified clubs and societies and have been deemed to produce a service to students at Acadia.

Acadia Graduate Students' Society

The Acadia Graduate Students (AGS) is an Internal Organization committed to advocating for graduate student concerns at Acadia. AGS is composed of the President and a faculty representative from Arts, Science and Professional Studies. The association also has counsellors at large, who can be involved but not as voting members. AGS also serves the graduate students at Acadia by striving to aid in the provision of a positive recreational and academic environment.

High turnover of graduate students due to program completion leaves AGS in the hands of each successive graduate student body. With the support of the ASU, the AGS Executive and council determine the year's focus and activities.

Axe Radio

The online radio station serves to benefit Acadia University, Acadia's students, and the community of Wolfville by strengthening communication between Acadia and the community of Wolfville as well as inter-student communication. The radio strives to provide a supplemental outlet for free artistic, cultural, and socio-political expression, entertainment, and discussion of controversial material within quality, thought-provoking programming in a manner conducive to free thought and open debate.

The radio can be tuned-in to online from anywhere on or off campus, or heard in the Students' Union Building. Any campus or community member is invited to create their own show or help out at any time during the year.

Community Outreach Acadia

Community Outreach Acadia is a growing internal organization created and guided by students seeking to make positive and sustainable changes in the Acadia community. The club aims to engage Acadia students within Wolfville by presenting a wide spectrum of volunteer opportunities for students. Some of their initiatives include; Neighbours-Helping-Neighbours, Meal Exchange, and youth centred development programs.

Acadia Environment and Sustainability Office (AESO)

The AESO aims to provide an avenue through which students with an interest in environmental issues can learn and grow, as well as educate and reach out to Acadia students, faculty, staff, and the broader Wolfville community. Past projects include: Enviro-Week, Homemade facials night, and The Project Green Challenge.

The Athenaeum

The Athenaeum has served as Acadia's official student newspaper since 1874. Each week it can be found all across campus, which means it's one of the most efficient and anticipated tools for informing the student body. The Athenaeum is also a member of the Canadian University Press (CUP) and adheres to the Charter of Rights and Responsibilities of CUP.

The Athenaeum is created by and for, members of the Acadia Community. The paper strives to provide fair and unbiased commentary on major issues and events in and around Acadia; this includes student events on campus, University events, and happenings in the greater Wolfville area.

The Axe Yearbook

Every year, the ASU publishes The Axe Yearbook which serves as the official record for the past year of life at Acadia. Candid shots of students, events, residences, clubs, as well as grad photos are all a part of the book as a means to record the year. All students are encouraged to submit some of their favourite pictures for publication in the book. The Axe is available for pickup from the Information Desk when it is published in the Fall of the following school year.

Acadia Pride

Acadia Pride is aimed at providing an outlet for lesbian, gay, bisexual, trans-gendered, two-spirited, and queer (LGBT2IQ) individuals, as well as friends, and allies.

The group provides support for students, staff, and faculty dealing with issues related to sexual orientation and gender identity. Pride also aims to build a community within Acadia University, and promote its many goals including creating awareness of issues surrounding sexual orientation and promoting an open and safe atmosphere at Acadia University by breaking down the walls of homophobia, trans-phobia and other related issues.

Centre for Global Education

The Centre for Global Education (CGE) was founded in 2007 by Acadia students. The CGE seeks to facilitate and promote dialogue between various cultures at Acadia through hosting cultural events and activities. These dialogues seek to increase inclusiveness, and awareness of different cultures within Acadia and the community of Wolfville.

Mental Health Initiative

It is the hope of the Acadia Mental Health Initiative to improve the lives of those affected by mental illness. With specific attention to Acadia students, the society strives to do this in a variety of ways empowering students to get involved in ways that are meaningful to them. Most importantly, the combination of all the activities held by the MHS as a whole and its presence on campus have made Acadia a safer place to talk about mental health.

Acadia Women's Centre
The Women's Centre is a feminist organization.

Student Association Memberships

The ASU is an active member of the Canadian Alliance of Student Associations (CASA) and StudentsNS formerly the Alliance of Nova Scotia Student Associations).

References

External links

University Site

Students' associations in Canada
Students' Union